Joelle Catherine "Jaycie" Johnson (born April 18, 1995) is an American professional soccer player who plays as a striker for Kansas City Current in the National Women's Soccer League (NWSL).

Youth career
A Lake Winnebago, Missouri native, Johnson enjoyed a prolific youth career with Lee's Summit West High School and Sporting Blue Valley Soccer Club, previously known as Kansas City Football Club until a merger. She scored 195 goals for Lee's Summit West, earning all-state honors all four years, as well as 2012 NSCAA All-America and 2013 Gatorade Missouri Girls Soccer Player of the Year awards.

College career
A four-star recruit and rated the No. 148 player in the country, Johnson committed to Nebraska Cornhuskers. She had a record-breaking freshman year in 2013, leading the team in goals (17) en route to Soccer America All-Freshman Team honors. In Nebraska's NCAA first-round match, Johnson became the first freshman and only the fifth player in history to score four goals in an NCAA tournament match.

Johnson followed up her freshman season with 11 goals in 2014 and 3 goals in 9 matches before tearing her ACL on September 25, 2015. Coming back from her season-ending injury, she again scored 11 goals in 2016, ending her college career with her first NSCAA All-America (third-team) honors as a senior.

Club career
North Carolina Courage selected Johnson in the third round of the 2017 NWSL College Draft, but she suffered a knee injury and missed the entire 2017 NWSL season.

Ahead of the 2018 NWSL season, Reign FC invited Johnson to its preseason camp as a trialist, and she made the team as a National Team Replacement player on March 30. She subsequently made the first-team roster on July 10, after a long spell on the disabled list.

Johnson remained with Reign FC in 2019 as a supplemental player, but she was moved to the season-ending injury list on June 28, 2019. The club declined to pick up her contract options for 2020 at the end of the season.

Ahead of the 2021 season, Johnson was picked up by Kansas City NWSL.

International career

Johnson was a member of the United States U23 team in 2015.

References

External links 
 
 
 Nebraska Cornhuskers profile

1995 births
Living people
American women's soccer players
National Women's Soccer League players
Nebraska Cornhuskers women's soccer players
North Carolina Courage draft picks
People from Cass County, Missouri
OL Reign players
Soccer players from Missouri
Sportspeople from the Kansas City metropolitan area
Women's association football forwards
Kansas City Current players